Maingkwang is a town in north-east Kachin State in Myanmar.

Populated places in Kachin State